Fritz Hartmann (24 February 1911 – 11 November 1989) was a Swiss racing cyclist. He rode in the 1935 Tour de France.

References

1911 births
1989 deaths
Swiss male cyclists
Place of birth missing